This page shows the standings and results for Group I of the UEFA Euro 2012 qualifying tournament.

Standings

Matches
Group I fixtures were negotiated between the participants at a meeting in Madrid, Spain, on 19 February 2010.

Goalscorers

Discipline

References 

Group I
2010–11 in Scottish football
2011–12 in Scottish football
2010–11 in Spanish football
Qual
2010–11 in Czech football
2011–12 in Czech football
Czech Republic at UEFA Euro 2012
2010 in Lithuanian football
2011 in Lithuanian football
2010–11 in Liechtenstein football
2011–12 in Liechtenstein football